Lusine Gevorkyan (Lousine Gevorkian; , ; born 21 February 1983) is the lead singer of the Russian nu metal band Tracktor Bowling and the alternative rock/punk band Louna.

Gevorkyan was born in Kapan. She was one of the founding members of the Russian band  Sfera Vliyaniya, but she left the group one year after its establishment. Later, she was picked as the lead singer of another project, Tracktor Bowling, that became one of the most popular metal bands in Russia. In 2008, she founded one more band, Louna, and at the moment Lusine is a member of both.

Discography

Albums, singles, DVD

References

External links 
 Louna's official page
 Tracktor Bowling's official page

1983 births
Living people
People from Kapan
Women heavy metal singers
21st-century Armenian women singers
Armenian rock musicians
Armenian emigrants to Russia
Nu metal singers
Russian people of Armenian descent
Russian rock musicians